Francis John Byrne (1934 – 30 December 2017) was an Irish historian.

Born in Shanghai where his father, a Dundalk man, captained a ship on the Yellow River, Byrne was evacuated with his mother to Australia on the outbreak of World War II. After the war, his mother returned to Ireland, where his father, who had survived internment in Japanese hands, returned to take up work as a harbour master.

Byrne attended Blackrock College in County Dublin where he learned Latin and Greek, to add to the Chinese he had learned in his Shanghai childhood. He studied Early Irish History at University College Dublin where he excelled, graduating with first class honours. He studied Paleography and Medieval Latin in Germany, and then lectured on Celtic languages in Sweden, before returning to University College in 1964 to take up a professorship.

Byrne's best known work is his Irish Kings and High-Kings (1973). He was joint editor of the Royal Irish Academy's New History of Ireland (9 volumes). A festschrift in his honour was published in 1999 under the editorship of his former student Alfred P. Smyth.

He retired in 2000, and died in December 2017.

References

Select bibliography
 Irish Kings and High-Kings. 3rd revised edition, Dublin: Four Courts Press, 2001. 
 Smyth, Alfred P. (ed.), Seanchas: Studies in Early and Medieval Irish Archaeology, History and Literature in Honour of Francis J. Byrne. Dublin: Four Courts, 1999.

External links
 UCD President's Report 2000 Announcement of Francis J. Byrne's retirement and biographical note

1934 births
2017 deaths
Alumni of University College Dublin
Celtic studies scholars
20th-century Irish historians
21st-century Irish historians
Irish writers
People educated at Blackrock College